KOD-171 is a prehistoric and historic archaeological site in the vicinity of Larsen Bay, a city on the north side of Kodiak Island in southern Alaska.  The site was discovered by Smithsonian Institution archaeologist Aleš Hrdlička and described in 1944 as containing both historical Russian artifacts as well as prehistoric Kachemak Bay tradition artifacts.  A 1978 survey team reported the site to include 22 house pits and an eroding shell midden.  The site, listed on the National Register of Historic Places in 1981, is subject to erosion and vandalism by pot hunters.

See also
National Register of Historic Places listings in Kodiak Island Borough, Alaska

References

Archaeological sites on the National Register of Historic Places in Alaska
Kodiak Island Borough, Alaska
National Register of Historic Places in Kodiak Island Borough, Alaska